Uttoxeter Racecourse is a National Hunt racecourse in Uttoxeter, Staffordshire, England.

Course
Uttoxeter is a left-handed oval shaped course of 1 mile 2½ furlongs in circumference.

The back ‘straight’ has a dog-leg to the right and is undulating as it rises over Clump Hill. The course continues with a downhill run around the far bend into the home straight.

The home straight of four furlongs is flat and galloping ensuring fair and competitive finishes to most races including the signature staying chases. The nature of the track often enables front-running tactics to pay off.

History
The racecourse was built in 1907 and opened by a company formed to take over the interests and licence of Keele Park racecourse, which had recently ceased to operate. There were 5 days of racing in 1907, 2 in May, 2 in October and 1 in December. According to 'The Racecourse of Great Britain and Ireland' guide "the meeting is largely patronised by the nobility and gentry and sportsmen in the county there being 100 members already subscribed to the Club". Horse racing was suspended throughout the country in 1914 during the First World War.

Racing resumed in 1921, although the first meeting had to be abandoned on account of bad weather. 4 meetings a year were held, in April, May, September and October, and although the course never broke records, there were always good fields, big crowds, and a small but steady profit for the Racecourse Company. During the Second World War, the course was requisitioned by the War Department and no racing took place.

In 1949, the Uttoxeter Urban Council appointed a committee to investigate the non-resumption of racing after the war. Part of the course consisted of a four-acre field which the Racecourse Company did not own, but only leased from a farmer, who was reluctant to lease or sell it to them at a sum which they could afford. It appeared the company would have to go into liquidation and the racecourse would disappear.
After much debate, the racecourse re-opened on 12 April 1952. With a crowd of 12,000, the meeting was successful enough for the organisers to be almost overwhelmed. The Uttoxeter Urban Council had come to the rescue of the course and their decision to buy it was upheld by the community.

1966 Popular, but without the funds to modernise and rebuild as the Executive would have wished, in 1966 the course took its place in the modernisation lists of the Horserace Betting Levy Board. A scheme was drawn up and approved whereby £167,000 would be spent in giving the course its long overdue facelift, Mrs.Olive Davis a local bookmaker and chairman of Uttoxeter council along with MrMr John Kenny MBE and clerk to the course at both Uttoxeter and Stratford instigated the facelift and pursued the levy board for the funds. Olive became Chairman of Uttoxeter Racecourse, and was known as the Mrs Toppam of Uttoxeter, after the only other female racecourse chairman in England at the time ( Mrs Topham of Anitree). Olive Davis then continued to promote the race course on non-race days in the newly built Paddock Suite, which became the main venue in Uttoxeter for, weddings, Balls, Disco parties, and private functions. Laying the foundations fortoday's popularity for the racecourse as a place to hold an event. Mrs Olive Davis was also known for her support and pioneering activities in the crusade to get ladies accepted as jockeys. Her husband Raymond Davis was a well known national Hunt Jockey and her father was Arthur Birch a renowned trainer. Olive died in 1999, but her dedication to Uttoxeter racecourse is the corner stone of its success today .
1967 Champion jockey Josh Gifford equalled Fred Winter's record of 121 winners in a season at Uttoxeter on 15 June, the very last meeting of the 1966–67 National Hunt term. The horse was five-year-old Jolly Signal trained by Earl Jones at Hednesford. Half an hour later Gifford broke the record when he rode Red Flush to a 10-lengths victory in the Ashbourne Handicap Chase.
1976 Rag Trade, owned by the flamboyant hairdresser Raymond 'Teasy Weasy' Bessone, won the Marston's Pedigree Midlands Grand National and followed-up by winning the Grand National at Aintree a few weeks later.
1982 Uttoxeter was again the decisive venue when John Francome, on John Edward's Buckmaster, gained his 800th overall winner and his 120th for the season to share the jump jockeys title with the sidelined Peter Scudamore.
1988 Sir Stanley Clarke CBE acquired Uttoxeter from East Staffordshire district council. Forming holding company Northern Racing, Clarke made a significant personal investment in facilities, including the creation of two new grandstands and a new paddock development.
1997 The Midlands National produced its most famous horse in Lord Gyllene, owned by Uttoxeter's chairman Sir Stanley Clarke. Lord Gyllene finished second to Seven Towers in the race but four weeks later recorded an historic victory in the Grand National at Aintree. His winning margin of 25 lengths was the most impressive in 20 years and he also recorded one of the fastest times in the race's history.
2002 History was made when Champion jockey AP McCoy became the winning-most National Hunt jockey of all time with his victory aboard Mighty Montefalco, marking his 1700th win.
2006 A fire broke out in a sponsorship van beside the grandstand. The grandstand, course and weighing room were evacuated. The crowd were sent out into the middle of the course away from blaze. No one was injured and racing was suspended for 1 hour and 40 minutes. The final race set off at 6.53 pm.

Name of Mascot is Utrotter as named by Emily-Kate Sanderson and Charlotte Waldie in 2005.

Notable races

External links
Uttoxeter Racecourse (Official website)
Course guide on GG.COM
Course guide on At The Races

Horse racing venues in England
Sports venues in Staffordshire
Sports venues completed in 1907
Uttoxeter
1907 establishments in England